Pittsfield Electrics may refer to:
Pittsfield Electrics (Eastern Association)
Pittsfield Electrics (Canadian-American League)